Maria Anatolyevna Sorokina (born 19 August 1995) is a Russian ice hockey player and member of the Russian national team, currently playing in the Zhenskaya Hockey League (ZhHL) with Agidel Ufa. 

Sorokina represented Russia at the IIHF Women's World Championships in 2015, 2016 and 2017.

References

External links
 

1995 births
Living people
Sportspeople from Tver
Russian women's ice hockey goaltenders
HC Agidel Ufa players
Connecticut Whale (PHF) players
Metropolitan Riveters players
Universiade gold medalists for Russia
Universiade medalists in ice hockey
Competitors at the 2017 Winter Universiade
Ice hockey players at the 2022 Winter Olympics
Olympic ice hockey players of Russia